Home is the second studio album by American electronic musician Nosaj Thing. It was released on January 22, 2013.

Critical reception
At Metacritic, which assigns a weighted average score out of 100 to reviews from mainstream critics, Home received an average score of 72% based on 15 reviews, indicating "generally favorable reviews".

Track listing

Charts

References

External links
 

2013 albums
Nosaj Thing albums
Innovative Leisure albums